Liu Yik Shing (born 17 July 1995) is a former Hong Kong professional footballer and current amateur player for Hong Kong First Division club North District. He plays as a midfielder.

References

External links
HKFA

Hong Kong footballers
Hong Kong First Division League players
Hong Kong Premier League players
Association football midfielders
Happy Valley AA players
Resources Capital FC players
1995 births
Living people